Belen is the southern terminus of the New Mexico Rail Runner Express commuter rail line, located in the center of the town of Belen, New Mexico, near the intersection of Reinken Avenue and Wisconsin Street. It serves residents of Belen and surrounding communities in Valencia County, New Mexico. The station began service on February 2, 2007, as the fifth station on the line.

Earlier, as recent as 1966, the Atchison, Topeka & Santa Fe operated a passenger train from Albuquerque, through Belen, to El Paso. Belen would have been part of an Amtrak passenger train from Los Angeles, California to Atlanta, Georgia that was never started.

Passengers can connect to shuttles serving Belen, Rio Communities, and Socorro. The station has free parking, with 220 spaces.

Each of the Rail Runner stations contains an icon to express each community's identity. The icon representing this station is the Harvey House in Belen, which is within walking distance of the station.

References

Railway stations in New Mexico
Railway stations in the United States opened in 2007
Buildings and structures in Valencia County, New Mexico
Transportation in Valencia County, New Mexico
2007 establishments in New Mexico